The Champaign–Urbana Challenger is a professional tennis tournament played on indoor hard courts. It is currently part of the ATP Challenger Tour. It is held annually in Champaign, Illinois, United States, since 1996.

Past finals

Singles

Doubles

External links
Official website
Atkins Tennis Center
ITF search

 
ATP Challenger Tour
Hard court tennis tournaments in the United States
Recurring sporting events established in 2005
Annual sporting events in the United States
Champaign, Illinois